Prime Plaza Hotels & Resorts is hotel chain which is headquartered in Jakarta, Indonesia. The company was founded in 2003. 

In some instances the establishment of the chain was based upon the re-branding of former Raddison properties.

The company operates a hotel and resort chain, with brand names such as Prime Plaza, Prime Biz and Prime resort in many locations across the Indonesian archipelago.

Properties
Prime Plaza Hotel Kualanamu Medan
Prime Plaza Hotel Purwakarta
Prime Plaza Hotel Sanur Bali
Prime Plaza Hotel Jogjakarta
Sanur Paradise Plaza Suites
Sanur Paradise Plaza Hotel
Amadea Resort & Villas Seminyak Bali
Gili Eco Villas
Bali Dynasty Resort Kuta
Menjangan Dynasty Resort Bali
PrimeBiz Surabaya
PrimeBiz Cikarang
PrimeBiz Karawang
PrimeBiz Tegal
PrimeBiz Dan Mogot Jakarta

References

External links
 Prime Plaza Hotel & Resorts

Companies based in Jakarta
Hospitality companies of Indonesia
Hotel chains in Indonesia
Hotels established in 2003
Indonesian brands